The women's rhythmic group 5 ribbons competition at the 2015 European Games was held at the National Gymnastics Arena on 21 June 2015. The six best results from the All-Around Final qualified in the Final.

Results

References 

Women's rhythmic group 5 ribbons